Kim Steinmetz (born December 22, 1957) is an American former professional Women's Tennis Association (WTA) player. She was born and raised in St. Louis, Missouri. She retired from professional tennis in 1989.

Career highlights 

Steinmetz competed in over 26 Grand Slam (tennis) tournaments over her 10-year tennis career.

Steinmetz' victory over Natasha Zvereva in the 1988 U.S. Open is often cited as her greatest victory. Following her win over Zvereva, Steinmetz lost to Arantxa Sánchez Vicario.

Post career 

Following her retirement from professional tennis, Steinmetz began teaching in 1990. She is currently the tennis director at the Missouri Athletic Club.

Earnings 

Steinmetz' career earnings on the professional tour totaled $90,856.

References

External links
 
 

1957 births
Living people
American female tennis players
Tennis people from Missouri
21st-century American women